The Castle of Acquafredda is a medieval castle in Siliqua, province of South Sardinia, Italy.

History
It is fairly widespread opinion that the castle was built by order of Count Ugolino della Gherardesca, who actually became the owner of the fort in 1258. The castle however dates back to an earlier period as it is already mentioned in a papal bull of 1215. After the death Count Ugolino, the castle passed to Pisa and then, in 1324, to the Aragonese. Abandoned since 1410 it later passed to various Sardinian feudal lords until it was ransomed by the king of Sardinia Victor Amadeus III in 1785.

Recently, the excavations near the castle site have yielded the remains, buried in the bare earth, of three man aged 34-45.

Notes

Castles in Sardinia